Maguy Bou Ghosn (born 18 September 1975) is a Lebanese actress. Bou Ghosn debuted her acting career in Syria and the Persian Gulf region. In 2008, she made her breakthrough in Lebanon with the drama TV series "Asr el Hareem" and "Metel El Kezzeb" in 2011, both being aired on LBC. She is a Murex d’Or winner.

Acting career
Bou Ghosn studied acting and directing at the Lebanese University. Her acting career debuted when she started portraying in all successful TV series through the Arab World including Syria and the Persian Gulf. In 2008, Bou Ghosn portrayed Amira in "Asr El Harim", Jana in "Maitre Nada", Vera in "Dr. Hala", Jihane in "Metel El Kezzebeh". In 2011, Bou Ghosn made starred in the well-advertised Ramadan comedy TV Series "Akher Khabar" and her fans loved her performance, calling it a very new of kind. Later that year, Bou Ghosn starred in a Comedy-Drama TV series "Auberge", which aired on MTV from 2011 till 2012 and it was such a great success. In Ramadan 2012, Bou Ghosn starred in "Duo Al Gharam" and played the leading role beside Carlos Azar. She then starred in her first movie "BeBe" in 2013, which considered to be the number 1 movie in Lebanon with over 152,000 admission tickets within 14 weeks. That movie was then followed by two successful movies "Vitamin" in 2014 and "Al Sayyida Al Thaniya" in 2015. All three movies were highly advertised and said to have sold a huge number of admission tickets.

Bou Ghosn was the lead actress in a number of Ramadan series. In "24 Qirat" (2015) she shared the leading role with Abed Fahed and Cyrine Abdelnour. In 2016, she shared the leading role of her new Ramadan series "Ya Rayt" with Qays Cheikh Najib and Maxim Khalil. Other works she appeared in include the movie "Welaane" (2016), the series "Caramel" (2017), the movie "Habbet Caramel" (2017) and the series "Julia" in Ramadan 2018.

Music career
Bou Ghosn attending the launching of her charity single "Saken El Sama Byesmaa".
Bou Ghosn's childhood dream was always to become a successful singer. In late 2011, Bou Ghosn participated in the second season of Celebrity Duets in which she and Carlos Azar battled in the finale prime for the grand prize. Bou Ghosn won and donated her prize to St. Jude Children Cancer Center. On 15 June 2012, Bou Ghosn premiered her first charity single "Saken El Sama Byesmaa", composed by Oussama Al Rahbani and written by Ghadi Al Rahbani, during the launching of the CD. On June 16, Bou Ghosn released her second single "Ma Ba2a Baddi Hebbak" which has been featured in her 2012 Ramadan TV series "Duo Al Gharam". In December 2013, Bou Ghosn participated in the huge concert One Lebanon by Tania Kassis.

Songs
 "Saken El Sama Byesmaa" (2012)
 "Ma Ba2a Baddi Hebbak" (2012)
 "Ossetna (featuring Carlos Azar)" (2012)
 "Ertahi Ya Hayati (featuring Carlos Azar)" (2012)
 "Kent Bfakker (Vitamin Movie)" (2014)
 "Kouni enti (habbet caramel)" (2017)

Filmography

References

External links

1977 births
Living people
Lebanese television actresses
People from Matn District
Lebanese Christians
Lebanese University alumni